Tolloid-like protein 1 is a protein that in humans is encoded by the TLL1 gene.

This gene encodes an astacin-like zinc-dependent metalloprotease and is a subfamily member of the metzincin family. A similar protein in mice is required during heart development and specifically processes procollagen C-propeptides and chordin at similar cleavage sites.

References

Further reading